State Road 455 (NM 455) is a  state highway in the US state of New Mexico. NM 455's eastern terminus is at NM 370 northwest of Clayton, and the western terminus is at Clayton Lake State Park northwest of Clayton.

Major intersections

See also

References

455
Transportation in Union County, New Mexico